Giacomina Lapenna (born Giacomina Lapenna, December 14, 1924 - died September 30, 2013) was an Italian entrepreneur, journalist, teacher, and communication expert. She was the first woman in Italy to work in the field of public relations. In 1958, she Co-founded the National Union of Public Relations Experts, Italy. She was also a member of several international public relations organizations and of the European association of women executives.

Personal life
Lapenna, born in Trieste in 1924 to Donato, father and Maddalena Raccamarich, mother. She graduated in modern literature at the University of Trieste. In 1951, she served as director, the cultural initiatives office, which was the first structure for public relations in an Italian university. She was co-founder of National Union of Public Relations Experts,(UNERP) in 1958, which was later renamed Italian Federation of Public Relations,(FIRP) in 1968.

References 

21st-century Italian businesswomen
21st-century Italian businesspeople
University of Trieste alumni

1924 births

2013 deaths